Hudson High School is a public high school located just outside Lufkin, Texas (USA) and classified as a 4A school by the University Interscholastic League. It is part of the Hudson Independent School District located in central Angelina County. In 2015, the school was rated "Met Standard" by the Texas Education Agency. In December 2021, Stephen F. Austin State University (SFA) announced Hudson High School as a Distinguished High School Program partner. With this, SFA began providing Hudson students with scholarship opportunities if they choose to attend the university.

Band
The school's band has a unique relationship with the nearby Apple Springs Independent School District.

Apple Springs participates in six-man football but does not offer a band program, while Hudson has a band but does not participate in football. Therefore, the Hudson band participates at Apple Springs games. The unusual relationship was filmed by the crew of the popular Texas Country Reporter.

Athletics
The Hudson Hornets compete in the following sports 

Baseball
Basketball
Cheer
Cross Country
Hudson Highlights
Golf
Soccer
Special Olympics
Swim
Softball
Tennis
Track and Field
Volleyball

State titles
Girls Softball - 
2012(3A), 2013(3A)

Notable alumni
 Brandon Belt, first baseman for the San Francisco Giants and Toronto Blue Jays

Electives and special programs 
Hudson High School provides the following special courses for its students to take

 Aeronautics
 Agricultural Science
 Art
 Band
 Choir
 Computer Science
 Cosmetology
 Culinary Arts
 Dual Credit Courses at AC
 Esports
 Floral Design
 Hornet Academy (ECHS)
 Nursing
 Photography
 Theatre Arts
 Welding
 Yearbook

Note: For any updates regarding these programs, please visit the Hudson High School website

Advanced Placement courses 
At Hudson High School, numerous Advanced Placement courses are offered by the College Board. These include:

 AP Calculus AB
 AP Chemistry
 AP English Language and Composition
 AP Psychology
 AP Spanish Language and Culture
 AP United States History

Note: For any updates regarding available AP Courses, please visit the Hudson High School Website

References

External links
Hudson ISD
Hudson Basketball Boosters

Schools in Angelina County, Texas
Public high schools in Texas